Paleologu may refer to:

Alexandru Paleologu, Wallachian 1848 revolutionary, father of Maurice Paléologue
Alexandru Paleologu (1919–2005), Romanian writer and diplomat
Jean de Paleologu (1855–1942), Romanian poster artist and painter
Theodor Paleologu (born 1973), Romanian historian and diplomat, son of Alexandru
Palaiologos, Byzantine Greek family
Albești-Paleologu, a commune in Prahova County, Romania